Julian Charles Sturdy (born 3 June 1971) is a British Conservative Party politician and farmer. He was elected at the 2010 general election as Member of Parliament (MP) for York Outer.

Early life and career
Sturdy was born on 3 June 1971 to Robert Sturdy, later a Conservative Party MEP, and he grew up in Yorkshire, England. From 1981 to 1989, he was privately educated at Ashville College, a co-educational private school in the spa town of Harrogate, North Yorkshire; he states "...my years there helped shape me into being the person I am today". He then studied at Harper Adams Agricultural College close to the village of Edgmond (near to the market town of Newport) in Shropshire.

Prior to entering Parliament, Sturdy served as a Harrogate councillor, between 2002 and 2007. He stood as the Conservative Party candidate for Scunthorpe in the 2005 general election, finishing second with 25.7% of the vote. He is also a farmer, a career for which he had studied at agricultural college.

Parliamentary career
First elected to the House of Commons as Member of Parliament for York Outer in the 2010 general election with a majority of 3,688, Sturdy became a member of the Transport Select Committee in July that year.

Sturdy successfully introduced a private member's bill introducing new procedures for handling horses abandoned or left to graze on others' land. The Control of Horses Bill passed into law in 2015 and was welcomed by the British Horse Society.

He was re-elected in the 2017 general election with 51.1 per cent of votes cast.

He has a mixed voting record in Parliament on the issue of regulating fracking, with two votes against greater environmental controls and two votes for more conditions and restrictions on where it can take place.

Following the publication of the Sue Gray report, Sturdy called for the resignation of Prime Minister Boris Johnson.

Personal life
Sturdy's wife is Victoria, who he employs part-time as his secretary on a salary just under £20,000. Victoria was caught drink driving in 2018 on the morning school run. The family live in London and Bilton-in-Ainsty, North Yorkshire.

References

External links

Julian Sturdy MP official constituency website
Julian Sturdy MP Conservative Party profile
York Conservatives

 

1971 births
Living people
People educated at Ashville College
Alumni of Harper Adams University
Conservative Party (UK) MPs for English constituencies
UK MPs 2010–2015
UK MPs 2015–2017
UK MPs 2017–2019
UK MPs 2019–present